The Brame is a  long river in the Creuse and Haute-Vienne départements, central France. Its source is at La Souterraine. It flows generally west. It is a right tributary of the Gartempe into which it flows between Thiat and Darnac.

Communes along its course
This list is ordered from source to mouth: 
Creuse: La Souterraine, Saint-Maurice-la-Souterraine
Haute-Vienne: Arnac-la-Poste, Saint-Hilaire-la-Treille, Saint-Sornin-Leulac, Dompierre-les-Églises, Magnac-Laval, Dinsac, La Bazeuge, Oradour-Saint-Genest, Le Dorat, Thiat, Darnac

References

Rivers of France
Rivers of Creuse
Rivers of Haute-Vienne
Rivers of Nouvelle-Aquitaine